KNEU (1250 AM, "KNEU FM 93.5 & AM 1250") is a radio station broadcasting a country music format. Licensed to Roosevelt, Utah, United States, the station is currently owned by Country Gold Broadcasting, Inc.

The call letters were formerly owned by the carrier current radio on-campus radio station at Northeast Missouri State University.

References

External links
 Official Website
 
 FCC History Cards for KNEU

NEU
Country radio stations in the United States
Radio stations established in 1978
1978 establishments in Utah